"Remember" is a song by American producer Gryffin and Zohara, released on October 26, 2018, through Darkroom and Geffen Records. It was released as the second single from Gryffin's EP Gravity: Part I and forthcoming album Gravity. It reached number one on the US Dance Club Songs chart in its issue dated February 23, 2019.

Background
Gryffin stated that he heard the demo of "Remember" recorded by Zohara Niddam and "immediately thought it'd be cool to flip it into a house record".

Critical reception
Kat Bein of Billboard said the song has an "energetic, funky club floor feeling". Rachel Narozniak of Dancing Astronaut claimed the song "represents Gryffin's stride further into pop territory", describing it as "lyrically confessional and tonally upbeat" as well as a "dance worthy, sing-a-long friendly number that visualizes bittersweet reminiscence on prior romance through a lighthearted lens". An article by edm.com's staff found that "Gryffin's effervescent and vaguely tropical brand of house shines through" on the song, while Zohara’s "radio-ready vocal reinforces the single's melancholic chord progression".

Charts

Weekly charts

Year-end charts

References

2018 singles
2018 songs
Gryffin songs
Song recordings produced by Mark Ralph (record producer)
Songs written by Jenna Andrews